Ghol Digrui is a village under Pursurah CD block, Hooghly district, in the Indian state of West Bengal. Pin code of Gholdigrui is 712401.

References 

Villages in Hooghly district